Buttermere Lake, with Part of Cromackwater, Cumberland, a Shower is a painting by J.M.W. Turner (23 April 1775 - 19 December 1851) which was exhibited at the royal academy in 1798.

References 

Paintings by J. M. W. Turner
1798 paintings
Rainbows in art
Rain in art